Nihonia circumstricta is a species of sea snail, a marine gastropod mollusk in the family Cochlespiridae.

Description
The length of the shell varies between 50 mm and 65 mm, its diameter between 15.5 mm and 19 mm. The shell has an elongate-fusiform shape. It contains 9 weakly angulate whorls

Distribution
This species occurs in the Indian Ocean off Tanzania at depths between 300–400 m.

References

 E. von Martens, Sitzungsberichte d. Gesellsch. nat. Freunde Berlin, 1901, p. 15.

External links
  Martens, E. von. "Einige neue meer-conchylien von der deutschen tiefsee-expedition." Sitzungsberichte der Gesellschaft naturforschender Freunde zu Berlin, 1901: 14 26.1904 (1901): 1–179
 Indo-Pacific Mollusca; Academy of Natural Sciences of Philadelphia. Delaware Museum of Natural History v. 2 no. 9–10 (1968–1969)

circumstricta
Gastropods described in 1901